Revin Khutor is a rural locality (a settlement) in Razdorsky Selsoviet, Kamyzyaksky District, Astrakhan Oblast, Russia. The population was 34 as of 2010. There is 1 street.

Geography 
Revin Khutor is located 28 km southeast of Kamyzyak (the district's administrative centre) by road. Chapayevo is the nearest rural locality.

References 

Rural localities in Kamyzyaksky District